Fly to the Rainbow is the second studio album by the German hard rock band Scorpions. It was released on 1 November 1974 in the United States through RCA Records. This was their first release with guitarist Uli Jon Roth and bassist Francis Buchholz, and the only one to include drummer Jürgen Rosenthal.

Background
In support of the Lonesome Crow album, Scorpions toured as the opening act for the British rock band UFO. At the end of the tour Scorpions lead guitarist Michael Schenker was asked to fill an open position as UFO's guitarist and accepted the position. Schenker's departure temporarily resulted in the breakup of the band but Rudolf Schenker and Klaus Meine ultimately merged with the band Dawn Road. The new band consisted of guitarist Ulrich Roth replacing Michael as well as drummer Jürgen Rosenthal, keyboardist Achim Kirschnig and bass guitarist Francis Buchholz. The new line up assumed the Scorpions name and recorded Fly to the Rainbow. Three songs on Fly to the Rainbow were co-written with departing guitarist Michael Schenker as part of his agreement on leaving the band.

Artwork
When asked to comment on the cover art for the album Uli Jon Roth said: "Don't ask me what that cover means… I disliked it from the beginning. It looked ludicrous to me back then and looks just as bad today. It was done by a firm of designers in Hamburg who had actually done a good job on the Lonesome Crow album before but I think that time they failed miserably. As for the meaning I can only guess, but I'd rather not…"

Live performances
Six songs from Fly to the Rainbow were regularly performed live by Scorpions: the title track, "Speedy's Coming", "They Need a Million", "This Is My Song", and "Drifting Sun". "Far Away" was already performed by early line-ups with Michael Schenker, since at least 1973. The live versions of "Speedy's Coming" and the title track appear on the live album Tokyo Tapes which was recorded in April 1978. Soon afterward Scorpions dropped these songs from their setlist. Between 1980 and 1999 nothing from Fly to the Rainbow appeared in Scorpions concerts. Following a one-off performance of They Need a Million on 7 June 1999 at Patinoire de Kockelscheuer, Luxembourg the title tune and "Speedy's Coming" were performed a number of times between 2000 and 2008. "Speedy's Coming" was played with relative frequency from 2015 to 2019.

Track listing

Personnel
Scorpions
 Klaus Meine – vocals
 Ulrich Roth – lead guitar, vocals on "Drifting Sun", storytelling in "Fly to the Rainbow"
 Rudolf Schenker – rhythm guitar, vocals on "They Need a Million", storytelling in "Drifting Sun"
 Francis Buchholz – bass guitar
 Jürgen Rosenthal – drums

Additional musician
 Achim Kirschning – organ, Mellotron, synthesizers

Production
 Mack – engineer
 Horst Andritschke – engineer

Charts

References

External links
Fly to the Rainbow at the-scorpions.com

1974 albums
Scorpions (band) albums
RCA Records albums